Brian Julian O'Neill (born 14 October 1972) is an Australian former professional rugby league footballer who played in the 1990s and 2000s. However O'Neill also regularly made headlines for his involvement in numerous controversial off-field incidents.

Early life
O'Neill was born in Hornsby, New South Wales on 14 October 1972. His mother, Patricia  O'Neill, a nursing sister, was killed in a car crash when he was seven . His father, Brian Allan O'Neill, a gynaecologist, died of heart disease when Julian was eight

O'Neill was raised by his grandparents and other family members from time to time. From age ten he attended boarding school at St Brendan's College in Yeppoon, Queensland. He was a prodigious young sportsman, holding school records in athletics, swimming.  represented as an Australian Schoolboy in rugby league, cricket and tennis .

Playing career
O'Neill was signed to a sporting scholarship with the Brisbane Broncos at age fifteen and was selected for the Australian Schoolboys side in 1989.

1990s
O'Neill was graded by the Broncos in 1990 and it was hoped he would take over the  position from Broncos great Wally Lewis. In the weeks following the grand final O'Neill travelled with the Broncos to England, where he played at fullback in the 1992 World Club Challenge against British champions Wigan, helping Brisbane become the first NSWRL club to win the match in Britain.

O'Neill briefly signed for English club Widnes, who were then coached by Phil Larder and he appeared as a substitute in the 1993 Challenge Cup Final at Wembley Stadium, only to suffer a 20-14 defeat by Wigan. O'Neill first represented Queensland, coming off the interchange bench, in Game II of the 1993 State of Origin series. He played at five-eighth in Game III. The Broncos reached the 1993 Winfield Cup Grand Final and O'Neill played at fullback as they again beat St. George for a second consecutive premiership title.

O'Neill then played at fullback in all three games of the 1994 State of Origin series under coach Wally Lewis. During the 1994 NSWRL season, O'Neill played at lock forward for defending premiers Brisbane when they hosted British champions Wigan for the 1994 World Club Challenge, but were defeated by the British club on this occasion. In 1994 and 1995 O'Neill was the Brisbane Broncos' top point-scorer. As his fame and confidence grew at the Broncos, O'Neill found himself at the centre of a number of alcohol-fuelled incidents. At Southport Magistrates Court in 1995 he faced five charges, following an incident at Conrad Jupiters Casino where he was reported to have urinated under a blackjack table, including indecent exposure and offensive behavior. He was found not guilty, three fraud charges were dropped and he was awarded costs. However he  walked away from the Broncos in 1995.

After being released by the Brisbane Broncos, O'Neill played a season with the London Broncos.

O'Neill made a fresh start back in Australia with the Western Reds in 1996 ARL season. He was playing for the Super League-aligned Western Reds during the 1997 split competition and made one state and one national representative appearance for the Super League representative teams: O'Neill was selected to play for Australia from the interchange bench in the inaugural Anzac Test and at fullback for Queensland in Game 1 of the Super League Tri-series. O'Neill set club records for most tries and goals in a match but was released by the Reds in 1997 as the super club could not afford to pay him, soon after the Western Reds folded and so did super league.

O'Neill made another clean start, switching to play in the 1997 ARL season with the South Sydney Rabbitohs. He gained selection for Queensland, playing from the interchange bench in Game II of the 1997 State of Origin series. In 1998 however he suffered immense publicity and a $10,000 fine from the club over a 1999 pre-season tour incident where a drunken O'Neill defecated in the footwear of teammate Jeremy Schloss. This incident became known as "the poo in the shoe" affair, and gained much media attention and public ridicule after O'Neill reportedly uttered the alliterative line, "I just shat in Schlossy's shoe," to his teammates. For a time he was engaged to Australian swimming star Samantha Riley, but the engagement ended. Riley  who was renowned for having a clean-living reputation despite being embroiled in a drugs controversy herself in the lead-up to the 1996 Atlanta Olympics.

2000s

O'Neill was signed to play the 2000 NRL season for the North Queensland Cowboys and was selected to play at five-eighth in Game II of the 2000 State of Origin series. He was then named the Cowboys' player of the year. He made a total of ten career State of Origin appearances.

In 2001, O'Neill's 13-month-old daughter, Piper, was killed when a television set fell onto her in his family's home. O'Neill returned to England the 2002 Super League season for the Wigan Warriors, enjoying victory in the Challenge Cup, until 2003 when he completed a mid-season move to the Widnes Vikings.

O'Neill returned to rugby league in England in 2005 and played half the season with the Wakefield Trinity Wildcats, then switching back to former club the Widnes Vikings until their relegation from the Super League that year. He then moved to also relegated Leigh Centurions for the 2006 season.

Sources and footnotes

External links
 Julian O'Neill at stateoforigin.com.au
 How Julian O'Neill got his Name Back – article at smh.com.au
 Julian O'Neill at yesterdayshero.com.au
 Article at smh.com.au
 Julian O'Neill's Super League Stats at rleague.com
 News Article

1972 births
Living people
Australian rugby league players
Australian expatriate sportspeople in England
Brisbane Broncos players
North Queensland Cowboys players
Queensland Rugby League State of Origin players
Australia national rugby league team players
Leigh Leopards players
London Broncos players
Rugby league fullbacks
Rugby league players from Sydney
South Sydney Rabbitohs players
Sportsmen from New South Wales
Wakefield Trinity players
Western Reds players
Widnes Vikings players
Wigan Warriors players